Lovrenc may refer to:

 Lovrenc Košir, Austrian civil servant who worked in Ljubljana
 Lovrenc Lavtižar (1820–1858), Slovene missionary in Minnesota, United States
 Lovrenc na Pohorju, a settlement in northeastern Slovenia

See also 
 Sveti Lovrenc (disambiguation), the name of several places in Slovenia